is a Japanese museum ship and former training vessel.  She is permanently docked in Yokohama harbor, in Nippon Maru Memorial Park.

She was built by Kawasaki Shipbuilding Corporation in Kobe, and was launched on 27 January 1930 alongside her sister ship Kaiwo Maru.  She was operated by the Tokyo Institute for Maritime Training to train officers for Japan's merchant marine.  At the beginning of World War II, her sailing rig was removed and she served as a training and postwar transport motorship.  In 1952, her rig was reinstalled and she resumed her training voyages until she was replaced in September 1984 by her successor, also named Nippon Maru.

Her gross tonnage is 2,286. She is rigged as a four-masted barque, with 32 sails covering , and two 600-horsepower diesel engines for auxiliary functions. During her career as a training ship, she was manned by a crew of 27 officers, 48 seamen, and 120 trainees.

Four-masted ships

Gallery

References

External links 

 Nippon Maru guidebook (in English)

Museums in Yokohama
1930 ships
Museum ships in Japan
Ships built by Kawasaki Heavy Industries
Training ships of Japan
Tall ships of Japan